North Western Reform Synagogue (usually known as Alyth, although Alyth is strictly speaking the name of the Jewish community that was founded in 1933; the synagogue is Alyth Shul) at Temple Fortune in north west London. The synagogue was built in Alyth Gardens in 1936, on land carved out from the West London Synagogue’s cemetery in Hoop Lane. Alyth is one of the largest Reform synagogues in the United Kingdom. It has around 2500 adult and 1000 child members. In 2021 its members approved a £6 million upgrade to the synagogue building.

Rabbis and Cantors
Alyth's clergy team is Rabbi Josh Levy (since 2008), Rabbi Hannah Kingston (since 2017),  Cantor Tamara Wolfson (since 2020) and Rabbi Elliott Karstadt (since 2020)

The synagogue's Rabbis and Cantors have been:

 1933–38 Rabbi Solomon Starrels
 1938–42 Rev. Maurice Perlzweig, who had been elected chair of the World Union of Jewish Students in 1933 and had helped to create the World Jewish Congress
 1942–43 Rev. Vivian Simmons, on secondment from West London Synagogue
 1943–58 Rabbi Dr Werner van der Zyl, who became founder and president of Leo Baeck College
 1958–72 Rev. Philip Cohen
 1972–83 Rabbi Dow Marmur
 1983–2003 Rabbi Charles Emanuel
 2003–11 Rabbi Laura Janner-Klausner, later to become Senior Rabbi at the Movement for Reform Judaism
 2006–19 Rabbi Mark Goldsmith, who became Senior Rabbi at Edgware & Hendon Reform Synagogue in 2019
 2008–      Rabbi Josh Levy
 2015–      Rabbi Colin Eimer
 2017–      Rabbi Hannah Kingston
 2020–      Cantor Tamara Wolfson
 2020–      Rabbi Elliott Karstadt

Presidents

1947–1956: Leo Baeck (1873–1956), German rabbi, scholar, and theologian
1958–1971: Norman Bentwich

See also
 List of Jewish communities in the United Kingdom
 List of former synagogues in the United Kingdom
Movement for Reform Judaism

Notes and references

External links
  Official website
 The Movement for Reform Judaism's official website
 North Western Reform Synagogue on Jewish Communities and Records – UK (hosted by jewishgen.org).

1933 establishments in England
Reform synagogues in the United Kingdom
Religion in the London Borough of Barnet
Religious buildings and structures completed in 1936
Synagogues in London